Maccabi Netanya or better known as Maccabi "RE/MAX" Netanya is a professional beach soccer team based in Netanya, Israel.

2019 Israeli Beach Soccer League squad

Coach:  Liron Fartok

Honours

National competitions
Israeli Beach Soccer League
 Winners (4):
 2007, 2014, 2017, 2018
 Runners-up (6):
 2009, 2010, 2011, 2013, 2015, 2019

Sport in Netanya
Israeli beach soccer teams